Ruby (Koyukon: Tl'aa'ologhe) is an incorporated town in central western Alaska, situated on the south bank of the Yukon River at the northwesternmost tip of the Nowitna National Wildlife Refuge.  It is accessible only by boat or air.  A formerly sizeable gold-mining and lumbering town servicing the region, at the 2010 census the population was just 166, with only a general store and post office remaining as businesses, down from 188 in 2000.

History

The town of Ruby was established in 1911 as the result of a gold rush. The amount of gold that is in the Fairbanks district is over 8 million troy ounces (250 tonnes) of gold, lodes have yielded over 4 million ounces. Gold was first discovered at the current townsite in 1906 on Ruby Creek. That discovery brought more prospectors to the area. In 1910 word leaked out about a gold strike on Long Creek, 30 miles south of Ruby, and a stampede was on. Discoveries on other nearby creeks followed and Ruby became the supply point for the mines.

At its peak the population was near 3,000, but by 1918 the town was in steep decline. Many of the men had left to fight in World War I, and several of the towns business people and their families were lost in the sinking of the Canadian passenger liner Sophia. A fire in 1929 destroyed much of the business district and a flood in 1931 took out what was left of buildings on the riverfront.

After World War II, Native Americans from near-by Kokrines relocated to Ruby to take advantage of the abandoned homes. There are currently fewer than 200 people living in Ruby.

The largest gold nugget ever found in Alaska, was found near Ruby in 1998.

Geography
Ruby is located at  (64.737306, -155.487693).

Demographics

Ruby first appeared on the 1920 U.S. Census as an unincorporated village. It formally incorporated in 1973.

As of the census of 2000, there were 188 people, 68 households, and 42 families residing in the city.  The population density was 24.9 people per square mile (9.6/km2).  There were 107 housing units at an average density of 14.2 per square mile (5.5/km2).  The racial makeup of the city was 82.98% Native American, 13.83% White, and 3.19% from two or more races.

There were 68 households, out of which 44.1% had children under the age of 18 living with them, 35.3% were married couples living together, 16.2% had a female householder with no husband present, and 38.2% were non-families. 32.4% of all households were made up of individuals, and 10.3% had someone living alone who was 65 years of age or older.  The average household size was 2.76 and the average family size was 3.55.

In the city, the age distribution of the population shows 37.8% under the age of 18, 8.0% from 18 to 24, 23.4% from 25 to 44, 25.5% from 45 to 64, and 5.3% who were 65 years of age or older.  The median age was 33 years. For every 100 females, there were 111.2 males.  For every 100 females age 18 and over, there were 108.9 males.

The median income for a household in the city was $24,375, and the median income for a family was $26,667. Males had a median income of $21,250 versus $24,167 for females. The per capita income for the city was $9,544.  32.3% of the population and 23.8% of families were below the poverty line.   45.3% of those under the age of 18 are living below the poverty line.

Education
The Yukon–Koyukuk School District operates the Merreline A. Kangas School in Ruby.

Notable people
 Barry Clay (born 1955), Discovered Alaska's largest gold nugget, 294 oz (9.15 kg), in 1998 in the Ruby mining district
 Emmitt Peters (1940–2020), Last rookie to win the Iditarod Trail Sled Dog Race (in 1975)

See also
 Ruby-Poorman mining district

References

Cities in Alaska
Cities in Yukon–Koyukuk Census Area, Alaska
Yukon River